Povratak otpisanih (Serbian Cyrillic: Повратак отписаних) is a Yugoslav TV series, and sequel of 1974 TV series Otpisani.

Plot  
In the autumn in 1944, Prle and Tihi, still young, but this time veterans of the resistance movement together with Joca, old and moody radio operator, should arrive with radio station in Belgrade, the capital of Yugoslavia, still occupied by the Nazi Germans, and remain in it until the liberation. As the victorious Partisan forces are approaching, Prle, Tihi, and Joca must continue their work in the underground, in order to prepare the city for liberation.

Main cast 
Pavle Vuisić as Joca
Dragan Nikolić as Prle
Voja Brajović as Tihi
Zlata Petković as Marija
Aleksandar Berček as Mrki
Stevo Žigon as German officer Kriger
Vasa Pantelić as Krsta Mišić

Fiction set in 1944
World War II television drama series
Yugoslav drama television series
Radio Television of Serbia original programming
1970s drama television series
1978 Yugoslav television series debuts
1978 Yugoslav television series endings
Serbian-language television shows
1970s Yugoslav television series
Television shows set in Belgrade
War films set in Partisan Yugoslavia
Television shows filmed in Belgrade
Fictional Yugoslav Partisans